Milk Day may be a reference to:
 Harvard Milk Day, an unofficial celebration in Harvard, Illinois, USA
 Harvey Milk Day, a celebration of the life of Harvey Milk, a murdered gay rights activist
 World Milk Day, a United Nations organized day to celebrate the importance of milk
 National Milk Day (India), an observance of Verghese Kurien's birthday by the Indian milk industry

See also
Martin Luther King Jr. Day, often written as MLK Day